Upper Town or Uppertown may refer to:

Canada
Upper Town, a historic neighbourhood in Ottawa, Ontario

Greece
Upper Town (Thessaloniki)

Ukraine
 Uppertown (Kyiv) or Old Kyiv

United Kingdom
Upper Town, Bonsall, a United Kingdom locations in Derbyshire
Upper Town, Hognaston, a United Kingdom locations in Derbyshire
Uppertown, Derbyshire, a settlement within Ashover
Upper Town, County Durham, a United Kingdom location
Upper Town, Herefordshire, a place in Herefordshire
Uppertown, Highland, a United Kingdom location
Uppertown, Northumberland, a United Kingdom location
Uppertown, Orkney a place in Orkney
Upper Town, Suffolk, a United Kingdom location
Upper Town, Somerset, a settlement in North Somerset
Upper Town, West Yorkshire, a United Kingdom location
Upper Town, Wiltshire, a hamlet within Christian Malford

United States
Upper Town, California
Upper Towns, in Cherokee history, a Cherokee residential region

See also
Places that translate to "Upper Town" in English:
 Gornji Grad - Medveščak, an administrative city district in Zagreb, Croatia
 Gornji Grad, a historic neighborhood in Zagreb, Croatia (also known as Gradec)
 Gornji Grad, Slovenia, a town and municipality in Slovenia
 Gornji Grad (Zemun), an urban neighborhood of Belgrade, Serbia
Upperton (disambiguation)